Bradwyn M. Guinto (born October 20, 1991) is a Filipino-Australian professional basketball player for the Converge FiberXers of the Philippine Basketball Association (PBA).

Early life
Guinto was born in Bataan but raised in Melbourne, Australia. His first sport was tennis as he had the chance to watch the Australian Open and grew up idolizing former champion Michael Chang. Aside from tennis, he also tried rugby and cricket. He then made the switch to basketball. He also played in youth leagues in Australia.

College career 
Guinto played for the San Sebastian Stags in the NCAA. Expectations in his first year were that his team would be rebuilding, especially after San Sebastian lost its stars Calvin Abueva, Ian Sangalang, and Ronald Pascual. He got his first college career win in Season 89 against the Arellano Chiefs with a double-double of 10 points and 14 rebounds. He then had 15 points in a win against the EAC Generals. Due to typhoid however, he missed some games. He contributed to San Sebastian making the Final Four as the third seed. He was a contender for Rookie of the Year, but lost to Perpetual Altas' Juneric Baloria.

In Season 90, Guinto contributed 14 points and 12 rebounds in a win over the JRU Heavy Bombers that gave his team an early solo lead in the standings. He had 18 points and nine rebounds in a close loss to Perpetual. He bounced back with 13 points and 14 rebounds in a win against the St. Benilde Blazers. The team, however, lost so much games that they fell to second to the last place in the standings. They finished in eighth place. He averaged 14.17 points, 11.11 rebounds, and a block in 30.83 minutes of play in 18 games. He was also named to the Mythical Five and the All-Defensive Team. 

The following season, the Stags lost key players and had a new head coach in Rodney Santos (Topex Robinson had been the previous coach). This put more pressure on Guinto to lead the team. After losing their first game of Season 91, he had 17 points, 20 rebounds, four assists, two steals, and two blocks as the Stags rallied to beat the Bombers. In a loss to the Letran Knights, he was limited to just four points. He bounced back with 26 points and 18 rebounds, but the Stags still lost against the Chiefs. He was also a NCAA All-Star that year. Against the league-leading San Beda Red Lions, he had 26 points and the win. He also had 25 points and 11 rebounds in a win over JRU. However, they were not able to make the Final Four. He also lost Defensive Player of the Year to Allwell Oraeme, but made the All-Defensive team.

Professional career

Mahindra Enforcer 
Guinto was drafted by the Mahindra Enforcer with the 14th overall pick in the 2015 PBA draft. He had 17 points on 7-of-9 shooting, 13 boards, three blocks, one steal, and one assist in 33 minutes in a 101–97 loss to the Talk ‘N Text Tropang Texters. He had six points in a loss to the Alaska Aces, but had 19 rebounds, which was the most by any rookie in the last two years. Those performances had him as one of the frontrunners to win Rookie of the Year early in the season. He eventually lost Rookie of the Year to the Meralco Bolts' Chris Newsome.

NLEX Road Warriors 
On November 8, 2016, Guinto, along with Chito Jaime, was traded to the NLEX Road Warriors for Rob Reyes, Jeckster Apinan, and Reden Celda. He debuted with 17 points and 10 rebounds in a win over the Aces. During this time, he was named to the Gilas 5.0 pool. This allowed him to be an All-Star that year.

NorthPort Batang Pier 
On May 6, 2017, Guinto was traded to the NorthPort Batang Pier in a four-team trade. He debuted with eight points and seven rebounds. In 2018, he had 12 points and 10 rebounds against the TNT KaTropa. The following year, he signed a two-year extension with the team. He missed some games due to a knee injury.

Rain or Shine Elasto Painters 
On January 20, 2021, he was traded to the Rain or Shine Elasto Painters for Sidney Onwubere and Clint Doliguez.

On January 25, 2023, Guinto became a free agent after his contract with Rain or Shine expired.

Converge FiberXers 
On January 27, 2023, Guinto signed a two-conference deal with the Converge FiberXers.

PBA career statistics

As of the end of 2022–23 season

Season-by-season averages
 
|-
| align=left | 
| align=left | Mahindra
| 34 ||	15.6 || .600 || .000 || .610 || 4.4 || .5 || .3 || .4 || 5.1
|-
| align=left rowspan=2| 
| align=left | NLEX
| rowspan=2|35 ||	rowspan=2|21.4 || rowspan=2|.544 || rowspan=2|.000 || rowspan=2|.689 || rowspan=2|5.3 || rowspan=2|.9 || rowspan=2|.3 || rowspan=2|.5 || rowspan=2|6.9
|-
| align=left | GlobalPort
|-
| align=left | 
| align=left | GlobalPort / NorthPort
| 35 ||	14.2 || .466 || .125 || .600 || 3.5 || .3 || .2 || .5 || 4.1
|-
| align=left | 
| align=left | NorthPort
| 12 ||	19.5 || .676 || .000 || .667 || 3.8 || .8 || .4 || .3 || 5.3
|-
| align=left | 
| align=left | NorthPort
| 9 || 10.5 || .571 || – || .400 || 1.8 || .1 || .0 || .7 || 2.2
|-
| align=left | 
| align=left | Rain or Shine
| 15 ||	9.0 || .353 || – || .714 || 1.7 || .1 || .2 || .3 || 1.1
|-
| align=left rowspan=2| 
| align=left | Rain or Shine
| rowspan=2|10 || rowspan=2|5.1 || rowspan=2|.600 || rowspan=2|.000 || rowspan=2|.500 || rowspan=2|.9 || rowspan=2|.0 || rowspan=2|.0 || rowspan=2|.1 || rowspan=2|.8
|-
| align=left | Converge
|-class=sortbottom
| align=center colspan=2 | Career
| 150 || 15.3 || .542 || .083 || .637 || 3.7 || .5 || .2 || .4 || 4.5

Personal life 
Guinto has a younger brother Jerwyn, who played for San Sebastian's Team B and the Lyceum Pirates. He was drafted by the San Miguel Beermen in the Season 47 draft.

References

1991 births
Living people
Australian men's basketball players
Basketball players from Bataan
Centers (basketball)
Converge FiberXers players
Filipino emigrants to Australia
Filipino men's basketball players
NLEX Road Warriors players
NorthPort Batang Pier players
Philippine Basketball Association All-Stars
Power forwards (basketball)
Rain or Shine Elasto Painters players
San Sebastian Stags basketball players
Terrafirma Dyip draft picks
Terrafirma Dyip players